Curling Clubs in the Canadian province of Nova Scotia are organized by the Nova Scotia Curling Association. The following is a list of clubs in the province.

14 Wing Greenwood Curling Club - Greenwood
Amherst Curling Club - Amherst
Baddeck Curling Club - Baddeck
Barrington Regional Curling Club - Barrington Passage
Berwick Curling Club - Berwick
Bluenose Curling Club - New Glasgow
Bridgetown Curling Club - Bridgetown
Bridgewater Curling Club - Bridgewater
Brookfield Curling Club - Brookfield
CFB Halifax Curling Club - Halifax
Chedabucto Curling Club - Boylston
Chester Curling Club - Chester
Clare Curling Association - Meteghan
Dartmouth Curling Club - Dartmouth
Digby Curling Club - Digby
Glooscap Curling Club - Kentville
Halifax Curling Club - Halifax
Highlander Curling Club - St. Andrew's
Lakeshore Curling Club - Lower Sackville
Liverpool Curling Club - Liverpool
Lunenburg Curling Club - Lunenburg
Mayflower Curling Club - Halifax
Middleton Curling Club - Middleton
New Caledonian Curling Club - Pictou
Northumberland Community Curling Club - Pugwash
Schooner Curling Club - Sydney
Shelburne Curling Club - Shelburne
Stellar Curling Club - Stellarton
Strait Area Community Curling Club - Port Hawkesbury
Sydney Curling Club - Sydney
Truro Curling Club - Truro
Westville Curling Club - Westville
Windsor Curling Club - Windsor
Wolfville Curling Club - Wolfville
Yarmouth Curling Club - Yarmouth

 Nova Scotia
Curling clubs
Curling in Nova Scotia
 
Nova Scotia